Penhale Jakes is a hamlet west of Breage in west Cornwall, England, UK.

References

Hamlets in Cornwall